Japhet Yao Ledo is a former Moderator of the General Assembly of the Evangelical Presbyterian Church, Ghana (E.P. Church). He served as moderator of the church from January 1993 to January 2001, when he was replaced by Livingstone Komla Buama.

Ledo hails from Klefe in the Volta Region of Ghana, just as his successor Buama.

After retiring as Moderator, he served in various capacities including as Chairman of the Evangelical Presbyterian University Fund  Raising Committee.

See also
Evangelical Presbyterian Church, Ghana

References

Living people
Ghanaian clergy
Ghanaian Presbyterians
Ghanaian religious leaders
Year of birth missing (living people)
Place of birth missing (living people)
People from Volta Region
Ewe people